Afḍal al-Dīn Muḥammad ibn Nāmāwar ibn ʿAbd al-Malik al-Khūnajī, best known as Afḍal al-Dīn Khūnajī (May 1194–December 1248), was a Persian scholar and a judge (qadi) in Ayyubid Egypt. He is an important figure in the history of logic in the Arabic language. He appears to have hailed from the locality of Khunaj (a small town to the north of Zanjan) which had been destroyed in the 13th century during the Mongol invasion of Iran.

Extant works
 al-Jumal
 al-Mujaz
 Kashf al-asrār ʿan ghawāmiḍ al-afkār
 Kulliyyāt
 al-Mūjaz fī ʿilm al-amrāḍ or al-Asbāb wa-l-ʿalāmāt
 al-Maṭālib al-ʿāliya fī l-ʿilm al-ilāhī

Sources
 
 
 

1194 births
1248 deaths
13th-century Iranian people
Scholars from the Ayyubid Sultanate
Iranian logicians
Iranian Arabic-language writers